JBuilder is a discontinued integrated development environment (IDE) for the programming language Java from Embarcadero Technologies.  Originally developed by Borland, JBuilder was spun off with CodeGear which was eventually purchased by Embarcadero Technologies in 2008.

Oracle had based the first versions of JDeveloper on code from JBuilder licensed from Borland, but it has since been rewritten from scratch.

Versions

JBuilder 1 through 3 are based on the Delphi IDE. JBuilder 3.5 through 2006 are based on PrimeTime, an all-Java IDE framework. JBuilder 2007 "Peloton" is the first JBuilder release based on the eclipse IDE framework.

See also
Comparison of integrated development environments

References

External links
History of some JBuilder versions

CodeGear software
Java development tools
Integrated development environments
Cross-platform software